Edward Gowen Budd (December 28, 1870 – November 30, 1946) was an American inventor and businessman.

Early life
Edward Gowen Budd was born in Smyrna, Delaware, on December 28, 1870. He studied engineering in Philadelphia in 1888. He took correspondence courses and studied at the Franklin Institute.

Career

Early career
He worked as an apprentice in a machine shop. In 1899, he moved to Philadelphia to finish his apprenticeship with the Bement Machine Company. He then took his knowledge of pressed steel to the railroad industry. He worked with the Pullman Company on a contract for Pennsylvania Railroad, building the first all-steel car.

From 1900 to 1902, he worked for the American Pulley Company as a shop superintendent. He then worked for Hale & Kilburn, designing railroad car seats and interior trim. He resigned in 1912 after the firm showed lack of enthusiasm in moving into the automobile body business.

Budd Company

In 1912 he founded the Budd Company, which initially specialized in the manufacture of pressed-steel chassis frames for automobiles.

His company was soon supplying an all-steel sedan body to auto manufacturers. Following discussions between them which began in 1913 Budd's first big supporters were the Dodge brothers, who purchased 70,000 all-steel open touring bodies in 1916. They were soon followed by an all-steel Dodge sedan. The brothers had not believed such a thing possible but they were persuaded to allow Budd to go ahead with the design, die-making and press-installation needed for actual production to begin. Other US manufacturers soon followed Dodge's lead. Closed bodies outsold open bodies from 1923 on.

To hold all this steel together, Budd also pioneered the use of arc welding in automobile manufacturing.

Stainless steel

During the Great Depression in the 1930s, Budd pioneered the fabrication of stainless steel and helped create the Pioneer Zephyr, a streamlined train for the Chicago, Burlington and Quincy Railroad. Budd stainless steel railway cars were very successful for many years. During World War II, Budd was also the original maker of the Bazooka projectile and the rifle grenade. He and his company were also instrumental in the development of the radial disk brake and the automatic wheel line.

Personal life
Budd married Mary Wright in May 1899. He had two sons, Edward G. Budd Jr. and Archibald W. Budd, and three daughters.

Death
Budd died on November 30, 1946 at his home in Philadelphia. He is buried at West Laurel Hill Cemetery.

Legacy
Budd's Pioneer Zephyr was the first of many streamlined passenger trains. The original trainset is on permanent display at Chicago's Museum of Science and Industry.

In 1985, 40 years after his death, Edward G. Budd, the "father of the stainless-steel streamliner", was inducted into Dearborn, Michigan's Automotive Hall of Fame.

In 2015, 70 years after his death, Edward G Budd was inducted into Galesburg, Illinois's National Railroad Hall of Fame.

He also received the American Society of Mechanical Engineers's Medal.

See also
 Joseph Ledwinka

References

 PBS Online / WGBH (2000) Edward G. Budd.
 President and Fellows of Harvard College (2004), 20th Century Great American Business Leaders: Edward G. Budd.
 
 Steel in our lives. Retrieved January 19, 2005
 

1870 births
1946 deaths
People from Smyrna, Delaware
American automotive pioneers
American people in rail transportation
American mechanical engineers
Businesspeople from Delaware
Burials at West Laurel Hill Cemetery
ASME Medal recipients